In sociology, mechanical solidarity and organic solidarity are the two types of social solidarity that were formulated by Émile Durkheim, introduced in his Division of Labour in Society (1893) as part of his theory on the development of societies. According to Durkheim, the type of solidarity will correlate with the type of society, either mechanical or organic society. The two types of solidarity can be distinguished by morphological and demographic features, type of norms in existence, and the intensity and content of the conscience collective.

In a society that exhibits mechanical solidarity, its cohesion and integration comes from the homogeneity of individuals—people feel connected through similar work; educational and religious training; and lifestyle. Mechanical solidarity normally operates in traditional and small-scale societies (e.g., tribes). In these simpler societies, solidarity is usually based on kinship ties of familial networks.

Organic solidarity is a social cohesion based upon the interdependence that arises between people from the specialization of work and complementarianism as result of more advanced (i.e., modern and industrial) societies. Although individuals perform different tasks and often have different values and interests, the order and very solidarity of society depends on their reliance on each other to perform their specified tasks. Thus, social solidarity is maintained in more complex societies through the interdependence of its component parts. Farmers, for example, produce the food that feeds the factory workers who produce the tractors that allow the farmers to produce the food.

Features

References

Sociological terminology
Émile Durkheim